Kazuhiro Sakamoto   is a Japanese mixed martial artist. He competed in the Bantamweight and Featherweight divisions. Sakamoto is a longtime Shooto and Vale Tudo Japan veteran and currently serves as a representative and promoter for Shooto and Vale Tudo Japan.

Career
Sakamoto trained in amateur wrestling before becoming a trainee under Satoru Sayama at the Super Tiger Gym. He was the lightweight champion of the second pre-shooting tournament. He was a frequent opponent of Kenichi Tanaka, another Sayama trainee whom he fought and eventually captured the Shooto Lightweight 65 kg (143.3 lb) Championship from.

He is now a head trainer at Shooting Gym Tokyo. 

Sakamoto currently coaches current Rizin FF fighter Kazuma Kuramoto.

Championships and Accomplishments
Shooto
Shooto Lightweight 65 kg (143.3 lb) Championship (One time)
One successful title defense

Mixed martial arts record

|-
| Win
| align=center| 13-4
| Leonid Zaslavsky
| Submission (rear naked choke)
| Shooto - Vale Tudo Perception
| 
| align=center| 1
| align=center| 2:11
| Tokyo, Japan
| 
|-
| Win
| align=center| 12-4
| Rene Stigter
| Submission (armbar)
| Shooto - Vale Tudo Access 4
| 
| align=center| 1
| align=center| 1:47
| Japan
| 
|-
| Win
| align=center| 11-4
| Imre Hagendoorn
| Submission (armbar)
| Shooto - Vale Tudo Access 3
| 
| align=center| 1
| align=center| 0:45
| Tokyo, Japan
| 
|-
| Win
| align=center| 10-4
| Akbar Talei
| Submission (kimura)
| Shooto - Shooto
| 
| align=center| 1
| align=center| 2:35
| Tokyo, Japan
| 
|-
| Win
| align=center| 9-4
| Mamoru Okochi
| Submission (kimura)
| Shooto - Shooto
| 
| align=center| 3
| align=center| 0:35
| Tokyo, Japan
| 
|-
| Win
| align=center| 8-4
| Suguru Shigeno
| Submission (armbar)
| Shooto - Shooto
| 
| align=center| 2
| align=center| 0:55
| Tokyo, Japan
| 
|-
| Loss
| align=center| 7-4
| Noboru Asahi
| Decision (majority)
| Shooto - Shooto
| 
| align=center| 5
| align=center| 3:00
| Tokyo, Japan
| 
|-
| Win
| align=center| 7-3
| Hiroyuki Kanno
| Submission (armbar)
| Shooto - Shooto
| 
| align=center| 2
| align=center| 1:52
| Osaka, Japan
| 
|-
| Win
| align=center| 6-3
| Hiroaki Matsutani
| Submission (armbar)
| Shooto - Shooto
| 
| align=center| 3
| align=center| 0:00
| Tokyo, Japan
| 
|-
| Win
| align=center| 5-3
| Kenichi Tanaka
| Decision (unanimous)
| Shooto - Shooto
| 
| align=center| 5
| align=center| 3:00
| Tokyo, Japan
| 
|-
| Win
| align=center| 4-3
| Noboru Asahi
| Decision (unanimous)
| Shooto - Shooto
| 
| align=center| 5
| align=center| 3:00
| Tokyo, Japan
| 
|-
| Loss
| align=center| 3-3
| Kenichi Tanaka
| Submission (kimura)
| Shooto - Shooto
| 
| align=center| 2
| align=center| 2:37
| Tokyo, Japan
| 
|-
| Loss
| align=center| 3-2
| Kenichi Tanaka
| Submission (armbar)
| Shooto - Shooto
| 
| align=center| 1
| align=center| 0:00
| Tokyo, Japan
| 
|-
| Loss
| align=center| 3-1
| Yuichi Watanabe
| Submission (armbar)
| Shooto - Shooto
| 
| align=center| 2
| align=center| 2:54
| Tokyo, Japan
| 
|-
| Win
| align=center| 3-0
| Kenichi Tanaka
| Submission (armbar)
| Shooto - Shooto
| 
| align=center| 1
| align=center| 1:30
| Tokyo, Japan
| 
|-
| Win
| align=center| 2-0
| Suguru Shigeno
| Submission (armbar)
| Shooto - Shooto
| 
| align=center| 2
| align=center| 0:00
| Tokyo, Japan
| 
|-
| Win
| align=center| 1-0
| Tetsuo Yokoyama
| Submission (armbar)
| Shooto - Shooto
| 
| align=center| 1
| align=center| 0:00
| Tokyo, Japan
|

See also
List of male mixed martial artists

References

External links
 
 Kazuhiro Sakamoto at mixedmartialarts.com
 Kazuhiro Sakamoto at fightmatrix.com

Japanese male mixed martial artists
Bantamweight mixed martial artists
Featherweight mixed martial artists
Mixed martial artists utilizing shoot wrestling
Living people
Year of birth missing (living people)